Palayakkaran  is  a Telugu caste found in the state of Tamil Nadu in India   They are variously known as Palayakkara Naidu,  Palayakkara Naicker, Muthiriya Naidu and Muthiriya Naicker. Their ancestors were soldiers in what is now the state of Andhra Pradesh, where they served the polygars. Thus, many still speak the Telugu language at home and the Tamil language outside.
The community are mostly distributed in the  Chengalpattu and North Arcot   districts of Tamil Nadu but were originally from what is now the state of Andhra Pradesh.

References

Muthuracha

Social groups of Tamil Nadu